A CPA (Cooperativa de Producción Agropecuaria), or Agricultural Production Cooperative, is a type of agricultural cooperative that exists in Cuba today.

History of CPAs 
Cuban agriculture consists of state and private farms, both of which are managed by either the Ministry of Agriculture which manages livestock and various crops or the Ministry of Sugar which manages sugarcane. (Deree) There are many variations within these categories, thus expanding the agricultural sector to include cooperatives: UBPCs, CPAs, CCSs, private, and state. (Harnecker).

From the 1750s to 1800s, Cuba's agriculture was dominated by the plantation system which constituted the economy solely to the exports of sugar, tobacco and coffee. These commodities ran Cuba's economy for more than 150 years, until January 1959 with the Communist Revolution. (Burchardt). In 1959, 73.3 percent of the country's land belonged to only 9.4 percent of landowners, which also showed the disparity in wealth income due to agricultural production. (Harnecker)

The layout for cooperative agriculture was created after the 1959 Revolution with the Agrarian Reform Act which transferred 70% of farmland from vast colonial farms (Burchardt) to the state (Harnecker). The state farms were created with a Fordist model of immediate mass production via use of chemicals, massive productive units, and specialized units (Burchardt).

In 1960, the bank which provided loans to farmers shut down, and so the Credit and Service Cooperatives (Cooperativas de Créditos y Servicios, CCS) were created as a way for tobacco farmers to still receive necessary loans. CSS farmers still were individual owners of their land, and retained the liberty to exit the cooperative at any time and still own their land and their production. (Harnecker).

CSS consisted of farmers voluntarily joining each other to gain access to loans, new technology that would otherwise be too expensive to individually obtain, marketing benefits, among others. In 1961, National Association of Small Farmers (Asociación Nacional de Pequeños Agricultores, ANAP) was created to represent both individual and cooperative members. (Harnecker)

In 1975 a decision was made to switch to more advanced types of production, which created the Agricultural Production Cooperatives (Cooperativas de Producción Agropecuaria, CPAs). CPAs were private farmers who voluntarily donated their land to the cooperative. CPAs were different from CSS because the farmers received payment for selling their resources to the cooperative, after which becoming collective workers and owners.

Agricultural cooperatives, similar to CPAs, were experimented with in the first few years following the Cuban Revolution.

Between 1977 and 1983, farmers began to collectivize into CPAs for a variety of reasons. One of the major motives was that the state offered various incentives to farmers willing to join a CPA. For example, farmers selling their land to the state, would receive payments for a period of 20 years while also sharing in the fruits of the CPA. Also, joining a CPA allowed individuals who were previously dispersed throughout the countryside to move to a centralized, urban location with increased access to electricity, medical care, housing, and schools.

Currently Cuban farming has moved to a more autonomous system, "Autoconsumo": farms that set aside land for provisioning their own workers. Another change was that food goods are no longer delivered to the central marketing agency from the voluntary cooperatives, but are directly distributed, modeling capitalist economies. In this sense state control has yielded to autonomy for the farm.

Autonomy of CPAs 
CPAs are operated at a greater level of autonomy from the state than a UBPC or a state farm. Autonomy is limited by centralized economic planning as well as state control over the input market and output market.

Differences between UBPC and CPA:

Source: UBPC National Leadership, MINAG, 2010. (Harnecker)

Worker participation in CPAs 
CPAs allow for democracy within the workplace.  Democratic practice tends to be limited to business decisions and is constrained by the centralized economic planning of the Cuban system.

Differences Between Privately Owned Farms, State Farms, and UBPCs, 1994

Source: Abbassi 1994, 113. (Abbassi)

Cooperatives vs. Capitalist Cooperatives 
Summary of Capitalist and Cooperative Enterprises:

(Harnecker)

See also 

 Agriculture of Cuba
 Collective farming
 Organopónicos

References

 Frederick S. Royce, William A. Messina, Jr., and José Alvarez. "An Empirical Study of Income and Performance Incentives on a Cuban Sugarcane CPA." p. 457-471. In Cuba in Transition, Volume 7. (1997)
Deere, C. D. (1993). Household incomes in Cuban agriculture : a comparison of the state, cooperative, and peasant sectors. The Hague, Netherlands : Publications Office, Institute of Social Studies, [1993].
Cooperatives and Socialism: A View From Cuba CAMILA PIÑEIRO HARNECKER. (2013). Foreign Affairs, (5), 169. 
Burchardt, H.-J. (2001). Cuba's Agriculture after the New Reforms: Between Stagnation and Sustainable Development. Socialism & Democracy, 15(1), 141.
JENNIFER ABBASSI. (1998). The Role of the 1990s Food Markets in the Decentralization of Cuban Agriculture. Cuban Studies, 21.

Agricultural cooperatives
Agricultural organizations based in Cuba
Rural community development
Cooperatives in Cuba